"Canada-I-O" (also known as "Canadee-I-O" or "The Wearing of the Blue") is a traditional English folk ballad (Roud 309). It is believed to have been written before 1839.

When her love goes to sea, a lady dresses as a sailor and joins (his or another's) ship's crew. When she is discovered, (the crew/her lover) determine to drown her. The captain saves her and they marry.

Based on similarity of title, some connect this song with "Canaday-I-O, Michigan-I-O, Colley's Run I-O". There is no connection in plot, however, and any common lyrics are probably the result of cross-fertilization.

The Scottish song "Caledonia/Pretty Caledonia" is quite different in detail — so much so that it is separate from the "Canada-I-O" texts in the Roud Folk Song Index ("Canaday-I-O" is #309; "Caledonia" is #5543). The plot, however, is too close for scholars to distinguish.

Broadsides
 Bodleian, Harding B 11(1982), "Kennady I-o," J. Catnach (London), 1813-1838; also Firth c.12(329), Harding B 11(2039), "Lady's Trip to Kennedy"; Harding B 25(1045), "The Lady's Trip to Kennady"; Firth c.12(330), "Canada Heigho"; Firth c.13(240), Firth c.12(331), Harding B 11(2920), 2806 c.16(72), "Canada I, O"

Recordings
 Nic Jones, "Canadee-I-O" (on Penguin Eggs, 1980)
 Bob Dylan, "Canadee-i-o" (on Good as I Been to You, 1992)
 Seven Nations, "Canadee-i-o" (on Old Ground, 1995)
 Warren Zevon, "Canadee-I-O" (Live on Edmonton Folk Music Festival, 2002)
 The White Stripes, "Canadee I-O" (on Under Great White Northern Lights, B-Shows, 2010)
 10,000 Maniacs (on Twice Told Tales, 2015)
 The Outside Track, "Canadee-I-O" (on Light Up The Dark, 2015)
 Shirley Collins, "Canadee-i-o" (on Heart's Ease, 2020)

Alternative titles

 "Canada Heigho!!"
 "Kennady I-o"
 "Lady's Trip to Kennady"

Notes

References

 Sam Henry, Sam Henry's Songs of the People (1990), H162, pp. 333–334, "Canada[,] Hi! Ho!" (1 text, 1 tune)
 John Ord, Bothy Songs and Ballads (1930; Reprint edition with introduction by Alexander Fenton printed 1995), pp. 117–118, "Caledonia" (1 text)
 MacEdward Leach, Folk Ballads & Songs of the Lower Labrador Coast (1965), 90, "Canadee-I-O" (1 text, 1 tune)
 Maud Karpeles, Folk Songs from Newfoundland (1970), 48, "Wearing of the Blue" (1 text, 1 tune)
 Helen Creighton, Folksongs from Southern New Brunswick (1971), 109, "She Bargained with a Captain" (1 fragment, 1 tune)
 Dick Greenhaus & Susan Friedman (editors), "The Digital Tradition", CANADIO3* CALEDONIA*
 Roud Folk Song Index #309 and 5543
 

Bob Dylan songs
Folk ballads
Canadian folk songs
Irish folk songs
Year of song unknown
Songwriter unknown